Damien Troquenet is a French slalom canoeist who competed at the international level from 2003 to 2009.

Troquenet was born in Paris.

He won a silver medal in the C2 team event at the 2007 ICF Canoe Slalom World Championships in Foz do Iguaçu. He also won a silver medal in the C2 event at the 2009 European Championships in Nottingham. His partner in the C2 boat was Mathieu Voyemant.

In 2016, he moved to Tahiti and started racing Va'a. He subsequently won the Waterman Tahiti Tour in 2018 and 2019.

He represented French Polynesia in the half-marathon at the 2022 Pacific Mini Games in Saipan, Northern Mariana Islands, winning a silver medal.

References

1983 births
Living people
People from Paris
French male canoeists
Medalists at the ICF Canoe Slalom World Championships
French Polynesian male athletes